The Columbus Fireman's Park Complex consists of the Pavilion, a historic building used for many years and built by hand, the Rest Haven a building where people could use a resting place during a journey, and the Boys Scout Cabin and two gates into the complex  in Fireman's Park in Columbus, Wisconsin, United States. Fireman's Park became a Columbus city park in 1915, and the city's fire department developed the park as a community project. The park's pavilion opened in 1917; while mainly used for community dances, the pavilion also hosted a variety of other events. Another  building in the park, known as Rest Haven, opened in 1923. This building, a Prairie School structure designed by Alfred C. Clas, was used for cooking and sanitation by the many auto tourists who visited the park. The west wall and gate of the park were built in 1917 and are also part of the historic site. The park buildings were added to the National Register of Historic Places on February 25, 2004.

Images

References

Buildings and structures completed in 1917
Buildings and structures completed in 1923
Buildings and structures in Columbia County, Wisconsin
Parks on the National Register of Historic Places in Wisconsin
Prairie School architecture in Wisconsin
Victorian architecture in Wisconsin
Columbus, Wisconsin
National Register of Historic Places in Columbia County, Wisconsin